Grampian Police was, between 1975 and 2013 (replaced by Police Scotland), the territorial police force of the northeast region of Scotland, covering the council areas of Aberdeenshire, the City of Aberdeen, and Moray (the former Grampian region).  The Force area also covered some of the North Sea, giving Grampian Police the responsibility of policing the oil and gas platforms of the North East. The force was headquartered in Aberdeen.

The Police Authority had six representatives from Aberdeen City, six from Aberdeenshire, and four from Moray.

The force produced a quarterly magazine called The Informer for its staff, and, in 2009, launched a YouTube channel.

History 
Grampian Police was formed on 16 May 1975, when Grampian Region was created, a merger of the previously formed Scottish North Eastern Counties Constabulary and the Aberdeen City Police. The North Eastern force had been formed on 16 May 1949, by the merger of Aberdeenshire Constabulary, Banffshire Constabulary, Kincardineshire Constabulary, and Moray and Nairn Constabulary. The headquarters were situated in a newly constructed building on Queen Street in Aberdeen.

An Act of the Scottish Parliament, the Police and Fire Reform (Scotland) Act 2012, created a single Police Service of Scotland - known as Police Scotland - with effect from 1 April 2013. This merged the eight regional police forces in Scotland (including Grampian Police), together with the Scottish Crime and Drug Enforcement Agency, into a single service covering the whole of Scotland. Police Scotland has its headquarters at the Scottish Police College at Tulliallan in Fife.

The former Aberdeen headquarters has remained in use, however, in October 2020 Police Scotland announced that the building would be vacated the following year. Staff will move to other offices in Aberdeen and the area is set to be redeveloped. The public counter for the police will move to Marischal College.

Areas covered
Grampian Police covered the local authority areas of Aberdeen, Aberdeenshire and Moray.  In addition to this, Grampian have a lead role in incidents on offshore installations in Scottish areas of the North Sea, irrespective of which police area the installation is situated.  This arrangement exists due to Grampian's extensive experience in dealing with the offshore industry.

The railway stations and lines in the area are the responsibility of the British Transport Police, and a number of Ministry of Defence installations in the region are policed by the Ministry of Defence Police.  However, as with all territorial police forces, the chief officer of Grampian Police is ultimately responsible in statute for all law and order in Grampian police area, irrespective as to whether a special police force is present.

Departments and units

Grampian Police had a number of specialist departments and units, with officers joining them and undertaking this as their primary role. Amongst others, these included:

 Grampian Police Mountain Rescue Team
 Dog Section
 Underwater Search Unit (Grampian's Underwater Search Unit is the regional USU for Grampian, Northern Constabulary, and Tayside Police. However, it is staffed entirely by Grampian.)
 Armed Response Vehicles
 Oil and Energy Liaison Unit
 Criminal Investigation Department
 Wildlife Crime Unit
 Roads Policing Department (formerly the Traffic Department)
 Special Branch
 Financial Investigation Unit
 Family Protection Unit
 Education Liaison
 Professional Standards and Conduct Department
 Human Resources (Recruitment & Training)
 General Enquiries Department
 Major Investigation Teams

Pipe band
The Grampian Police Pipe Band, established in 1907, often played at events and competitions throughout Scotland. The group rehearses on a weekly basis in Aberdeen and comprises both police staff and civilians. The band launched its own design of tartan in 2007 and performed for Queen Elizabeth at Balmoral Castle to celebrate its unveiling.

Grampian Racist Incident Partnership
Grampian Racist Incident Partnership (GRIP) is a coalition of race equality groups led by Grampian Police officers. It was formed in May 2008 in response to a series of highly publicised racist assaults against Pakistani migrants and English travellers in Aberdeen.

In 2008 Grampian Police took part in the first GRIP campaign, designed to increase awareness in the bars and pubs of Aberdeen with an eye towards to protecting patrons from racist assaults. In 2010 it launched a campaign in conjunction with GRIP called 'RACISM – Report it Now!' The campaign involved putting up posters and stickers in shops, bars, restaurants, and post offices throughout the region urging people to report racist incidents.

GRIP had mixed results in its first two years. While the number of racist assaults against Pakistanis has been declining, there was a dramatic spike in 2009 in the number of assaults against people classified as "Other White" and "White British". Lewis Macdonald, the Labour member for Aberdeen Central, said the spike shows that "police are getting much better at recording a racial incident." Robert Brown, the Liberal Democrat member for Glasgow, said the spike was "truly shocking."

Significant events and incidents
Grampian Police were involved in many high-profile cases throughout Scotland, either as the investigating force, reviewing investigations on behalf of other forces, or providing specialist support.

 Piper Alpha disaster (investigating force)
 Arlene Fraser murder case (investigating force)
 George Murdoch murder (investigating force)
 Michael Holding murder (investigating force)
 Scott Simpson murder (investigating force)
 Renee MacRae mystery (reviewing force)
 Jolanta Bledaite murder (specialist support – underwater search)
 April 2009 North Sea helicopter crash (investigating police force, in partnership with Air Accident Investigation Branch and other agencies)

Chief Constables
Alexander Morrison (1975–1983)
Alistair G. Lynn (1983–1990)
Ian Oliver (1990–1998)
Andrew Gibson Brown (1998–2004)
Colin McKerracher (2004–2013)

Colin McKerracher CBE QPM LLB LLD Hon jChief Constable Grampian Police
Mr Colin McKerracher was appointed Chief Constable of Grampian Police on 12 April 2004.

Raised in Glasgow and served as a Police Cadet before joining The City of Glasgow Police on 20 May 1974.

During his career in Strathclyde Police, he has served in both operational and support positions, in a variety of general policing duties. He became Divisional Commander and also worked in a number of departments, including the Force Research and Development and Force Personnel Departments, before becoming Assistant Chief Constable responsible for Management Services, Community Safety and subsequently the Operational Portfolio. On 6 September 2001, he was appointed Deputy Chief Constable.

During his career he studied at Strathclyde University and in 1987 he graduated LLB.

Since joining Grampian Police, Mr McKerracher has been instrumental in achieving a more community based policing approach across the Force, under the banner 'Total Community' and he has been keen to place greater emphasis on tackling anti-social behaviour. He has ensured that national best practice and policy has been adopted by the Force to help reduce road traffic collisions and casualties.

He has overall responsibility for the policing of offshore installations, Royal residences on Deeside, as well as Aberdeen International Airport. He is a member of many local and national committees including those across the Association of Chief Police Officers Scotland Business Areas, which incorporates a responsibility for Counter Terrorism in the United Kingdom.

In June 2005, Mr McKerracher was awarded the Queen's Police Medal and in May 2006 he was admitted as Burgess of Guild as a mark of gratitude for his faithful service to the Burgh of Aberdeen.

Mr McKerracher was awarded a CBE on 31 December 2008 for services to policing in the community and received a Honorary Doctorate of Laws from Aberdeen University in July 2012.

External links
police scotlands Official website
archive of Grampian Police website

References

Defunct police forces of Scotland
Organisations based in Aberdeen
Aberdeenshire
Moray
1975 establishments in Scotland
Organizations established in 1975
2013 disestablishments in Scotland
Government agencies disestablished in 2013
Police